Chatenet is a commune in the Charente-Maritime in the department in the Nouvelle-Aquitaine region in southwestern France.

Geography
Chatenet is a small commune situated between the market town of Montendre and the large village of Chevanceaux. It is principally a farming community; however in recent years tourism has become important. The location of Chatenet in the southern tip of the Charente Maritime provides the area with a warm climate. The Seugne flows north-northwestward through the middle of the commune and forms part of its southern and northern borders.

Population

See also
 Communes of the Charente-Maritime department

References

External links
 

Communes of Charente-Maritime
Charente-Maritime communes articles needing translation from French Wikipedia